North Light Plant is an unincorporated community and census-designated place in San Juan County, New Mexico, United States. Its population was 414 as of the 2010 census. New Mexico State Road 574 passes through the community.

Geography

Demographics

Education
It is divided between Aztec Municipal Schools (the majority) and Farmington Municipal Schools (a minority section). Aztec High School is the local high school of the former.

References

Census-designated places in New Mexico
Census-designated places in San Juan County, New Mexico